Mayurbhatta was a 7th-century Sanskrit poet and scholar, who was 
brother-in-law of Banabhatta, the court poet of Harshavardhana, who is noted for having written Surya Satakam.

Mayurbhatta was suffering from leprosy. He performed penance at famous Deo Sun Temple located at Deo in present-day Aurangabad district, Bihar. He composed one hundred verses in praise of Lord Surya - the Sun God, and was cured of leprosy. While he was composing the verses, he was troubled by Brahmarakṣasa but he was able to defeat him and please the Sun God. The verses he composed became known as Surya Satakam.

Many Shakaldwipi Brahmins of the village Mayar in Aurangabad district of Bihar, claim themselves to be descendants of Mayurbhatta. Mayurbhatt's tradition of sun worship is still in existence in 'Mayar' village.

There is a very interesting story behind the composition of Surya- Shatak (The mysterious hills Umga by Premendra Mishra-6).  According to which, Mayur Bhatt, was the father-in-law or brother-in-law of Baan Bhatta, another Court poet of Harshvardhan. Banabhattah introduced himself as 'Brahmin' in Harshacharita and his residence as 'Brahmin abode'. Once, Bana Bhatta's wife became angry. She remained angry overnight. It was about to be morning. The moon began to brighten. The flame of the candle began to tremble. But she did not budge. Being impatient, Bana Bhatta made a verse and pleaded humbly. The three lines of verse are as follows-

"Gatpraya ratri: krishtanu shashi shiryat ev

Pradeepoaym nidra vashmugto ghurnan ev

Pranamanto manstsyjasi n tathapi kruddhmaho"

Meanwhile, the poet Mayur Bhatt came there and heard the three lines. His poetic consciousness was awakened. He forgot the dignity of the relationship and the fourth line spontaneously came out of his mouth-

"Kunchpratyasttya hridaymapi te chandi kathitam"

This line hurt Bana Bhatta and his wife. Especially his wife got very angry on such intervention. She cursed Mayur Bhatta to suffer from leprosy.

Soon, Mayur Bhatta performed prayer at famous Sun Temple at Deo in present Aurangabad district of Bihar to get rid of leprosy. He used to compose the verses under a Peepal tree in front of the Sun Shrine. Mayur Bhatta tied 100 threads on the Peepal tree. He used to compose a verse every day and untied a thread from the tree. He was determined that if Lord Sun did not cure him, he would commit suicide by diving from the tree. But soon he got upset with a Brahmarakshas (soul of a Brahmin) who lived on the same peepal tree. Brahmarakshas started troubling him by repeating the lines pronounced by him. Soon the victim Mayur Bhatta got a tip. He started chanting verses from his nose, which Brahmarakshas, who had no nose, failed to repeat and gave up. After this, Mayur Bhatta completed ‘Surya Shatak’ uninterruptedly. However, by virtue of listening to the Surya-Shatak, the Brahmarakshas became freed from his phantom-form. Mayur Bhatta was also cured of leprosy by the grace of God Sun. Many authors have mentioned almost similar stories in their books.

The Surya-Shatak contains one hundred verses in praise of Lord Sun. According to 'Surys Shatak' (Chaukhamba Publication, Varanasi) in verse no. 6 of Surya-Shatak, there is reference of leprosy and other descriptions of suffering it which may prove that the poet Mayur Bhatta had suffered from leprosy for a long time and prayed to lord Sun to be cured. Some scholars believe that Mayura was actually cured after composing this epic. The 6th verse of Surya Shatak goes to show that the Sun cures those who because of their numerous sins have bodies festered with wounds, nose feet and hands emaciated, and who emit long drawn sighs and utter indistinct words. His rays vindicate his unbounded and unimpeded compassion and are always worshipped by the Siddhas. May those rays ward off all your sins quickly.

Mayur Bhatta has neither introduced himself nor given his whereabouts anywhere. But the famous historian K.C. Srivastava (Prachin Bharat Ka Itihas tatha sanskriti]) has said that Bana Bhatta (close relative and friend of Mayur Bhatta) has written his own autobiography in detail in the first three chapters of his famous composition Harshacharit. On the basis of Bana Bhatta's description, some rational speculations about Mayur Bhatta can be made. In Harshacharit, Bana Bhatta describes himself as Vatsyayana Gotriya and Bhriguvanshi who used to reside in a village called Pritikoot.  He was a Shakadwipiya Brahmin (Mag or Bhojak). He has also described his childhood in Harshacharit. Bana Bhatta describes Pritikoot as a village on the banks of the River- Son i.e. Hirnybahu. According to the book 'Etihasik Sthanawali' (author- Vijayendra Kumar Mathur, page 592) of the Rajasthan Hindi Granth Academy, Jaipur, Banabhatta has described the village of Pritikoot as situated to the south of the confluence of the Ganges and Son rivers. (now Piru) village is located in Haspura block of Aurangabad district on the eastern bank of River Son.  Its distance is about 15 kilometres from Bhrigu Rishi's historical ashram (Bhrigurari), located in Goh block of Aurangabad district. Mayur Bhatta is said to be a native of Mayar (Shamshernagar) village of Daudnagar block under Aurangabad district. The village was named after him. Its distance is about 14 kilometres from village Pritikoot (now Piru).

Mayur Bhatt was a toxicologist also and in the first chapter (Uchchhavas) of Harshacharit, Bana Bhatta has described him as one of his 44 child-friends. According to the first chapter of Harshacharit (Dr. Keshavrao Musalgaonkar, Chaukhamba Sanskrit Institute, Varanasi), Bana Bhatta has associated himself with Goddess ‘Saraswati’. According to him, due to the curse of Durvasha Rishi, once Saraswati had to leave Brahmaloka and stay on earth. Her stay on earth was to end at the sight of her own son's face. Saraswati made her debut on the western bank of the Son River presently known as Shahabad region. Soon she fell in love with Dadhich, son of Bhrigukul-Vanshi- Chyawan who used to come to meet her crossing the river Son. According to Harshacharit, Dadhich's father's house was situated across (in the east of) the River Son. Soon Saraswati got a son from the union with Dadhich, whose name was Saraswat. With his birth, Saraswati was freed from the curse and went back to Brahmaloka. Distracted by this separation, Dadhich handed over his son to his own Bhrigu-Vanshi brother for upbringing and himself went for penance.

With the blessings of mother Saraswati, her son Saraswat knew all the Vedas and scriptures.  He settled Pritikoot and later he too went to join his father for penance. Later in the same clan, Munis, like Vatsa, Vatsyayan and then Bana Bhatt were born. This description shows that Bana Bhatta and Mayur Bhatt were residents of the eastern bank of the Son River. Chyavan Rishi's ashram is also situated in the village- Deokund under the Goh block of Aurangabad district. On this basis, we can speculate the place of origin of Mayur Bhatt because in ancient times, relatives / friends lived in the surrounding villages as the means of transport and communication were very less developed.

These areas, more particularly Piru and Mayar, are located near the eastern bank of Son River. The slight geographical distance of these four historical sites (Mayar, Piru, Bhrigurari, Chyawan Ashram at Deokund) and presence of Son River emphasize that it is the same Mayar and Pritikoot villages that were the original habitats of Mayur Bhatia and Bana Bhatta respectively. Some residents of these two places even today call themselves descendants of Mayur Bhatta and Bana Bhatta respectively. The distance of village Mayar is about 55 km from Deo by road.

The literary meaning of the word ‘Son’ or ‘Hiranya’ is ‘Gold’. Sand of the Son River contains particles of Gold. That's why it is called River- Son or Hirnyabahu.  Historian P.C. Roy Chaudhary (The Gaya Gazetteer, 1957, Govt. of Bihar)  also has called the river ‘Son’ as ‘Hirnyabahu’.

References

4.The mysterious hills Umga by Premendra Mishra

5. Suryasatakam of Mayur Bhatta, Chowukhamba sanskrit studies CXXIV, Varanasi

6. K.C. Srivastava -Prachin Bharat Ka Itihas tatha sanskriti

7. Harshacharit by Dr. Keshavrao Musalgaonkar, Chaukhamba Sanskrit Institute, Varanasi

8. P.C. Roy Chaudhary -The Gaya Gazetteer, 1957, Govt. of Bihar

7th-century Indian poets
Indian male poets
Sanskrit poets
Sanskrit writers
Scholars from Bihar

Etihasik Sthanawali' (author- Vijayendra Kumar Mathur), the Rajasthan Hindi Granth Academy, Jaipur